Las Cabras is a corregimiento in Pesé District, Herrera Province, Panama with a population of 1,914 as of 2010. Its population as of 1990 was 1,686; its population as of 2000 was 1,834.

References

Corregimientos of Herrera Province